Brad Little (born April 10, 1964) is an American musical theatre actor who has appeared in a number of Broadway and touring productions, most notably The Phantom of the Opera.

After several regional productions (one of which won him a Barrymore Award for Best Actor in a Musical), he made his national debut in 1988 in the United States national tour of Anything Goes as Billy Crocker. The next year, he took the role of Perchik in the Broadway and national tour productions of Fiddler on the Roof; in 1993, he played Cpt. De Castel Jaloux in Cyrano the Musical. He is known for being the longest running Phantom in Andrew Lloyd Webber’s musical the Phantom of the Opera.

In 1994, Little joined the cast of Andrew Lloyd Webber's The Phantom of the Opera as Raoul. In 1996, he joined the musical's national tour in the title role of the Phantom. In 2004, Brad joined the World Tour cast of the musical which toured Shanghai, Seoul, Taipei, Hong Kong, and Singapore. He returned to the role in the World Tour cast in 2012 for the second and subsequent seasons in Seoul, Bangkok, Singapore and Shanghai, and has become the world’s longest running Phantom after his tour in Shanghai. He is one of the only four men who have played the role of The Phantom for over 2,000 performances.

In 2006, he had a solo concert in South Korea that was recorded and released in CD format. In 2009, he toured with Jekyll and Hyde in which he played the title role. In 2010, he originated the role of Colonel Grayson in Frank Wildhorn's new musical Tears of Heaven which had its world premiere in South Korea. In 2012, he was the understudy of Michael Cerveris as Colonel Peron in the acclaimed Broadway revival production of Evita.

In Europe, he is known for starring as Jesus in Jesus Christ Superstar and as Tony in West Side Story. Other musicals include: Les Misérables (Javert), The Scarlet Pimpernel (Percy), Beauty and the Beast (The Beast), Evita (Che), Kiss Me, Kate (Fed/Petruchio), South Pacific (Lt. Cable), and The Who's Tommy (Capt. Walker), among others.

Little was married to actress Barbara McCulloh but has since divorced and moved to South Korea.

External links
Official website

References 

American male musical theatre actors
Living people
1964 births